Jermaine Walker (born April 5, 1977) is an American former professional basketball player.

Walker played college basketball for the Miami Hurricanes during the 1996–97 season. He was late to join the team as he failed his SAT twice before he passed it in December 1996. Walker left the Hurricanes in June 1997 to embark on a professional career.

Walker was under contract with Toronto Raptors (1999), Miami Heat (1999) and Orlando Magic (2002) of the National Basketball Association (NBA). He played professionally for Juve Caserta in Italy (1997–98), Rapid City Thrillers (IBA, 1997–98), La Crosse Bobcats (CBA, 1998–99), Idaho Stampede (CBA, 1999–00), Marinos de Oriente (Venezuela, 2000), Gulf Coast SunDogs (USBL, 2000), Memphis Houn'Dawgs (ABA, 2000–01), Elitzur Ashkelon (Israel, 2000–01), Lakeland Blue Ducks (USBL, 2001), Fargo-Moorhead Beez (CBA, 2001–02), FedEx Express (Philippines, 2002), Columbus Riverdragons and Huntsville Flight (NBDL, 2002–03), Marinos de Oriente (Venezuela, 2003–04), Aris Thessaloniki (Greece, 2004), Rockford Lightning (CBA, 2005),  Marinos de Anzoátegui (Venezuela, 2005), BCM Gravelines (France, 2005), Sioux Falls Skyforce (CBA, 2006) and again with Marinos de Anzoátegui in Venezuela in 2007 ).

Personal life
On September 22, 1998, Walker was shot in his left hip and had his car stolen after he was confronted outside his parents' house in Pompano Beach, Florida. Travaris Welch, who was identified by Walker, was charged with armed robbery and attempted murder.

References

External links
 College statistics
 NBDL page on Walker
 His player profile @ Hoopshype.com

1977 births
Living people
American expatriate basketball people in France
American expatriate basketball people in Greece
American expatriate basketball people in Israel
American expatriate basketball people in Italy
American expatriate basketball people in the Philippines
American expatriate basketball people in Venezuela
American men's basketball players
American shooting survivors
Aris B.C. players
Barako Bull Energy players
BCM Gravelines players
Columbus Riverdragons players
Fargo-Moorhead Beez (CBA) players
Huntsville Flight players
Idaho Stampede (CBA) players
Ironi Ashkelon players
Israeli Basketball Premier League players
Juvecaserta Basket players
La Crosse Bobcats players
Marinos B.B.C. players
Miami Hurricanes men's basketball players
Parade High School All-Americans (boys' basketball)
People from Pompano Beach, Florida
Rapid City Thrillers players
Sioux Falls Skyforce (CBA) players
Sportspeople from Broward County, Florida
United States Basketball League players